The year 656 BC was a year of the pre-Julian Roman calendar. In the Roman Empire, it was known as year 98 Ab urbe condita . The denomination 656 BC for this year has been used since the early medieval period, when the Anno Domini calendar era became the prevalent method in Europe for naming years.

Events

By place

Egypt 

 Thebes submits to the Egyptian ruler Psamtik I of Sais, who has allied himself with Gyges of Lydia and employs Libyan soldiers in a rebellion against Assyrian rule with help from Carian and Ionian mercenaries. Psamtik permits the city's mayor Mentuemhat to retain his position, who is not only the most powerful Theban but also the fourth prophet of Amon.
 Psamtik I extends his control over all Egypt. The Twenty-fifth Dynasty, and subsequent Nubian period, end in Ancient Egypt.

Assyria 

 King Shamash-shum-ukin of Babylon forms a secret alliance with Arabs, Aramaeans, Elamites, Persians, and Egyptians against his half brother Ashurbanipal.

Births

Deaths

References